Guards Club Island, also known as Bucks Ait or bucks' eyot is an island in the River Thames connected by footbridge by to Maidenhead, Berkshire accommodating a pier adjoining the Sounding Arch part of the railway bridge which was built in 1838 to designs by Brunel. The thin small island is connected to Guards Club Park by a low cast-iron and wood footbridge which blocks the near channel (backwater) to boat navigation apart from kayaks. The island gets its alternative name from eel bucks from which the footbridge was adapted in 1865 to allow access to its Guards Club Boathouse (since demolished).

The island is special status part of Guards Club Park (a public open space). Access to the island, a nesting site for water fowl, is restricted between December and June.

References

External links
Royal Borough of Windsor and Maidenhead parks information

See also
Islands in the River Thames
Ait

Islands of Berkshire
Islands of the River Thames